Barbara Marten (born 3 January 1947) is a British actress. She is most known for playing Eve Montgomery in Casualty. She has appeared in various soaps, including Eastenders and Brookside, as well as many other drama serials such as Harry, The Bill and Band of Gold.

Early life
Marten was born in Leeds, West Riding of Yorkshire, and grew up in County Durham. She went to an all-girls school ('William Newton School') in Norton, then Stockton and Billingham Technical College (which has since been demolished). She went to drama school at the London Academy of Music and Dramatic Art as a teenager for 3 years, and says that it actually put her off becoming an actress. She trained as a teacher in Birmingham and taught for two years before being drawn back to the stage. After becoming involved with a theatre group in Coventry, Marten joined a newly formed theatre group in Doncaster. They toured Yorkshire, performing plays about various subjects, including the St Leger, and another about battered wives.

Career
In 1996, Marten appeared at the National Theatre in Helen Edmundson's adaptation of Leo Tolstoy's War and Peace. She has also appeared in various other plays such as 'Hamlet, Who's Afraid of Virginia Woolf? (at Manchester Royal Exchange), The Winter's Tale (at the Royal Exchange), Get Up & Tie Your Fingers (Customs House), The Awkward Squad (West End), Heldenplatz (Arcola), The Enemies Within, Some Kind of Hero (at the Young Vic), The Glass Menagerie (Lyceum, Edinburgh), Everything Is Possible: The York Suffragettes (York Theatre Royal) and a touring production of An Inspector Calls.

From 1997 to 1999 she played the part of nurse 'Eve Montgomery' in Casualty. Since then she has appeared in many TV dramas, receiving much acclaim for her work in dramas such as Bob & Rose and Fat Friends. She played the lead role of Ellen in the British movie Between Two Women (2000), and then in "A Passionate Woman" (2010) as Moira. She appeared in the 2012 series Public Enemies.

She then played Hannah Greg in the period television drama series The Mill (between 2013-2014) which was about life at Quarry Bank Mill during the Industrial Revolution.

Barbara and her husband, Mike Kenny, (writer including 'The Railway Children' play) have three sons, Theo, Josh and Billy. She met him in the 1980s, while acting in a student pantomime in Birmingham, when they were studying to become a teachers. They have lived in York since 2004, having previously lived in Leeds. The children have studied at the Steiner School at Fulford.

Filmography

Television

Film

Awards
In 2018, she was nominated in for Drama Desk Award for Outstanding Featured Actress in a Play for her role in People, Places and Things at National Theatre/St. Ann’s Warehouse.

References

External links
interview

British actresses
Living people
British television actresses
1947 births
Alumni of the London Academy of Music and Dramatic Art
Actresses from Leeds